Ede Kallós (born Éliás Klein; February 17, 1866 in Hódmezővásárhely – March 11, 1950 in Budapest) was a Hungarian sculptor of Jewish heritage. His sculptural style integrated elements of realism and academism style mainly engaged in creating art for tombs.

Life 
Born in Hódmezővásárhely, Kallós studied in Budapest and Paris and his first major work was the statue "Dávid".

His portrait was painted by Károly Ferenczy.

Kallós died in 1950 in Budapest.

References

External links

 Biography & works of Ede Kallós

1866 births
1950 deaths
20th-century Hungarian sculptors
19th-century sculptors
Hungarian Jews
People from Hódmezővásárhely